Chudý (feminine: Chudá) or Chudy is a surname. Notable people with the surname include:
 Denis Chudý (born 2000), Slovak footballer
 Martin Chudý (born 1989), Slovak footballer
 N.U. Unruh (birthname Andrew Chudy, born 1957), German musician and instrument inventor

See also
 

Slovak-language surnames